Shruti Bapna is an Indian actress who has worked in commercial films, web series, and TV shows.

Career
Bapna started her career with theatre and made her film debut in Wake up Sid (2009). In 2013, she then appeared in The Lunchbox. She has since then worked in films such as Daddy, Mardaani 2, Gabbar is Back, Umrika and Chitrakut. Bapna appeared in shows The Verdict, Medically Yourrs, and MTV Girls on Top. She is also known for Saas Bina Sasural as Nitika, and for her role as Vandita Bala Chandran in Ye Hai Mohabbatein. Shruti started her career with the role of Parul in Jasuben Jayantilaal Joshi Ki Joint Family on Imagine TV.

Filmography

Films

Web series

Television

References

External links
 

Actresses from Mumbai
Living people
Year of birth missing (living people)
Indian television actresses
Indian film actresses
21st-century Indian actresses
Actresses in Hindi cinema
Actresses in Hindi television